Josh Phillips is an American voice actor.

Roles
Angel Tales - Guy
Haibane Renmei - Hyoko
Hellsing - Jan Valentine
Ikki Tousen - Genjo Kakoton
I My Me Strawberry Eggs - Kyosuke Aoki / Yoshihiko Nishimada
Melody of Oblivion - Kuron
Mortal Kombat vs. DC Universe - Green Lantern
NieA Under 7 - Genzo Somemiya
Texhnolyze - Hal

External links
 
 
 Josh Phillips at the English Voice Actor & Production Staff Database

American male voice actors
Living people
Place of birth missing (living people)
Year of birth missing (living people)